A list of films produced in Italy in 1922 (see 1922 in film):

External links
 Italian films of 1922 at the Internet Movie Database

Italian
1922
Films